Nariman Qeshlaq (also Romanized as Narīmān Qeshlāq; also known as Nareiman Gheshlagh, Nāremān Qishlāq, Narīmān, and Narīmān Qeshlāqī) is a village in Shivanat Rural District, Afshar District, Khodabandeh County, Zanjan Province, Iran. At the 2006 census, its population was 329, in 76 families.

References 

Populated places in Khodabandeh County